WiShi (Wear it, Share it) is a community powered fashion website and mobile application. Members upload their clothing items and accessories to create collages of outfits to recommend and share with the online WiShi community. WiShi also acts as an affiliate marketplace where users may purchase items included in recommended outfits.

History
Hila Angel and Lia Kislev founded WiShi in 2011 and launched their first prototype later that year. In September 2012 the company completed its first round of seed funding for venture capital from Jerusalem Venture Partners (JVP), headquartered in Jerusalem, for an undisclosed amount. The initial investment was for the development of the product with a launch in the United States. WiShi remained in Jerusalem at Jerusalem Venture Partners headquarters and incubator program until April 2014.

WiShi was named one of Israel's top 20 hottest start-ups of 2013 by Business Insider and was named a consumer start-up to watch by TechCrunch.

References

External links
 Official website

Companies established in 2011